Oksana Serhiïvna Sklyarenko (born May 4, 1981 in Novomoskovsk, Dnipropetrovsk Oblast) is a Ukrainian marathon runner. In 2008, she set a personal best time of 2:36:14, by winning the bronze medal in the Turin Marathon.

Sklyarenko represented Ukraine at the 2008 Summer Olympics in Beijing, where she competed for the women's marathon, along with her compatriot Tetyana Filonyuk. She finished the race in sixty-ninth place by two minutes behind Costa Rica's Gabriela Traña, with a time of 2:55:39.

References

External links

NBC Olympics Profile

Ukrainian female marathon runners
Living people
Olympic athletes of Ukraine
Athletes (track and field) at the 2008 Summer Olympics
People from Novomoskovsk
1981 births
Sportspeople from Dnipropetrovsk Oblast